The name Ian has been used for a total of eight tropical cyclones worldwide; two in the Atlantic Ocean, two in the Western Pacific Ocean and four in the Southwestern Pacific Ocean.

Atlantic: 
 Tropical Storm Ian (2016) – no threat to land
 Hurricane Ian (2022) – destructive Category 4 hurricane, made landfall in western Cuba, southwestern Florida, and the Carolinas
Western Pacific:
 Typhoon Ian (1987) (T8716, 16W) – no threat to land
 Tropical Storm Ian (1996) (11W) – approached Japan; Japan Meteorological Agency analyzed it as a tropical depression, not as a tropical storm

Australian Region:
 Cyclone Ian (1982) – moved erratically off the coast of Western Australia before making landfall
 Cyclone Ian (1992) – impacted Western Australia
South Pacific:
 Cyclone Ian (1997) – remained over open waters
 Cyclone Ian (2014) – impacted Tonga

Atlantic hurricane set index articles
Pacific typhoon set index articles
Australian region cyclone set index articles
South Pacific cyclone set index articles